Ishaya Bako  (born 30 December 1986) is a Nigerian film director and screenwriter.

Early life
He was born in Kaduna, where he lived all his life and later moved to London, where he studied at the London Film School.

Career
After attending the London Film School, Bako went on to script and direct the Africa Movie Academy Awards (AMAA)-winning Braids on a Bald Head. He won the Best Short Film Awards at the 8th Africa Movie Academy Awards. He is an emerging voice of his generation and a member of a select few Global Shapers, a collection of enterprising youths initiated by the World Economic Forum.

His film, Fuelling Poverty, a documentary on poverty and fuel subsidy in Nigeria, is narrated by Nobel Laureate, Wole Soyinka. He lives in Abuja, FCT, Nigeria. His film The Royal Hibiscus Hotel was screened at the 2017 Toronto International Film Festival.

He also was one of the writers for the movie Lionheart (2018 film).

See also
 List of Nigerian actors
 List of Nigerian film producers
 List of Nigerian film directors

References 

Nigerian film directors
Nigerian screenwriters
Living people
1986 births
People from Kaduna State
Alumni of the London Film School
Covenant University alumni
Nigerian film award winners
Nigerian documentary filmmakers